Sir William Henry Aykroyd, 1st Baronet, OStJ (8 May 1865 – 3 April 1947) was an English woollen and carpet manufacturer.

He was born in the West Riding of Yorkshire, the son of Alfred Aykroyd and Ellen (née Milnes), and educated at Thorp Arch Grange, near Wetherby. He entered his uncle's woollen and carpet manufacturing business, T. F. Firth & Sons Ltd, at Brighouse, and later became chairman. He was also chairman of Hammond's Bradford Brewery and managing director of the Bradford Dyers' Association.

He was created a baronet in the 1920 Birthday Honours. He was appointed High Sheriff of Yorkshire in 1926.

He was succeeded in the baronetcy by his eldest son, Major Alfred Hammond Aykroyd.

Footnotes

References
Obituary, The Times, 5 April 1947

1865 births
1947 deaths
People from Brighouse
English businesspeople
Baronets in the Baronetage of the United Kingdom
Officers of the Order of St John
High Sheriffs of Yorkshire